Lynn Cartwright (born Doralyn E. Cartwright; February 27, 1927 – January 2, 2004) was an American character actress known for her performance as the older version of Geena Davis' character, Dottie Hinson, in the 1992 film A League of Their Own.

Early years

Cartwright was born in McAlester, Oklahoma, the daughter of U.S. Congressman Wilburn Cartwright and his wife Carrie (née Staggs). She studied drama at Stephens College and at American Academy in New York.

Career 
Her acting career spanned from 1957 to 1992 and included smaller roles in films such as Black Patch (1957), The Cry Baby Killer (1958), The Wasp Woman (1959), All the Loving Couples (1969), Son of Hitler (1978) and Lovelines (1984). For 15 years, she was involved with the Group Repertory Theater in Los Angeles.

Cartwright was chosen for the role in A League of Their Own not just because she closely resembled Geena Davis, but also because many of her mannerisms were similar.

Personal life
Cartwright was married to actor and screenwriter Leo Gordon from February 14, 1950, until his death on December 24, 2000. She had a daughter, Tara, and a stepdaughter.

Death
She died in her home from complications of dementia on January 2, 2004, aged 76, after she fractured her hip. Her ashes and those of her husband are together in a memorial display in a columbarium at the Hollywood Forever Cemetery in Los Angeles.

Filmography

References

External links

1927 births
2004 deaths
People from McAlester, Oklahoma
American film actresses
Actresses from Oklahoma
Burials at Hollywood Forever Cemetery
20th-century American actresses
Deaths from dementia in California
21st-century American women